The Brookside Theatre is a 194-seat studio theatre situated in the centre of Romford in the London Borough of Havering, Greater London.

The theatre was established in 2012 and plays host to many full scale theatre productions; musicals and plays, tribute bands, live music, comedy and celebrity guests and has been heralded as "Romford's best kept secret".

History

The Theatre staged its first production in 2012; Shout! The Mod Musical, to raise money for the much needed renovation of the neglected war memorial buildings.

As well as producing in-house shows which have included Avenue Q, The Woman in Black, Sweeney Todd: The Demon Barber of Fleet Street, The Addams Family, Little Shop of Horrors, Peter Pan The Musical, and Hi-De-Hi, the theatre now plays host to touring plays, top tribute acts, concerts, comedy evenings and celebrity guests appearances. The theatre has also produced a number of UK / world premieres including Forever Dusty, Life Could Be a Dream, When Rock n Roll Dreams Come True and Goodnight Sweetheart The Musical.

The theatre and the war memorial renovation is a completely self-funded project that relies on the generosity and kindness of local companies and organisations and the support of the local community as well as the dedication of its volunteers.

Celebrity appearances

The following celebrities and bands have performed at the theatre:

 Derek Acorah
 Patti Boulaye
 Steve Brookstein
 Cannon & Ball
 John Challis
 Beverley Craven
 Richard Digance
 Dominic Kirwan
 Anita Harris
 Chas Hodges
 Jeffrey Holland
 Jimmy Jones
 Joe Longthorne
 Hazel O'Connor
 Tony Stockwell
 T'Pau
 The Honeycombs

Romford War Memorial
These historic buildings were officially opened on 11 October 1953, by Lt.-Col Sir Francis Whitmore the Lord Lieutenant of Essex, to commemorate residents, civilians and service personnel of the Borough of Romford, who lost their lives during World War II.

This once popular community hall and memorial, fell into severe neglect with one of the buildings boarded up well over two decades ago – this building houses commemorative oak panels engraved with the names of the fallen; a donation from the USAF in recognition of the hospitality they received whilst stationed here during the war. Following the construction of a ring road around this historic market town, in the early 1970s, large office blocks were erected, engulfing the memorial which was soon, sadly forgotten.

Alleged paranormal activity
The feature reached the international media's attention in 2014 following CCTV footage that allegedly showed possible paranormal activity.

References

External links
Brookside Theatre website
Romford War Memorial Social Club website

Theatres in the London Borough of Havering
Romford
Reportedly haunted locations in London